Mattia Caldara (born 5 May 1994) is an Italian professional footballer who plays as a centre back for  club Spezia, on loan from AC Milan. He has represented the Italy national team.

Club career

Atalanta

2013–14 season 
Born in Bergamo, Caldara began his career with hometown club Atalanta, entering in the youth categories. He played for the Primavera team from 2011 to 2014, (2013–14 season as an overage player), and on 5 May 2014, Caldara made his professional debut coming on as a second-half substitute in a Serie A match against Catania.

Loan to Trapani 
On 3 July 2014, he was loaned to Serie B side Trapani to gain more experience. On 14 August he made his debut as a starter in a 2–1 home defeat against Cremonese in the second round of Coppa Italia. On 7 September, Caldara made his Serie B debut as a substitute replacing Enis Nadarevic in the 62nd minute of a 2–1 home win over Vicenza. On 13 September he played his first entire match in Serie B for Trapani, a 2–1 home win against Cittadella. On 16 May, Caldara scored his first professional goal in the 96th minute of a 1–1 away draw against Avellino. On 22 May he scored his second goal in the 49th minute of a 2–1 home win over Pro Vercelli. Caldara ended his season-long loan to Trapani with 21 appearences and 2 goals.

Loan to Cesena 
On 10 July 2015, Caldara was signed by Serie B side Cesena on a temporary deal, with an option to purchase. On 9 August he made his debut for Cesena in a 4–0 home win over Lecce in the second round of Coppa Italia. On 20 August he played in the third round, a 4–1 away win over Catania. On 5 September, Caldara made his Serie B debut for Cesena, as a starter, in a 2–0 home win against Brescia. On 21 November, Caldara scored his first goal for Cesena in the 28th minute of a 1–1 away draw against Vicenza. On 8 December he was sent off with a double yellow card in the 89th minute of a 0–0 home draw against Trapani. On 19 December he scored his second goal in the 78th minute of a 4–0 home win over Ternana. On 23 January he scored his third goal in the 57th minute of a 2–0 home win over Virtus Entella. On 7 March, Caldara was sent off for the second time with a double yellow card in the 27th minute of a 2–1 home defeat against Salernitana. Caldara ended his loan to Cesena with 29 appearences, all as a starter, and 2 goals.

2016–17 season: Return to Atalanta 
After impressing newly appointed head coach Gian Piero Gasperini during pre-season, Caldara cemented a first-team place for the 2016–17 season; in manager's favored 3–4–3 formation, he began to play in the center of a back three. On 2 October he made his post-return debut in Serie A for Atalanta in a 1–0 home win over Napoli. On 26 October, Caldara scored his first goal for Atalanta and the only goal in the 60th minute of a 1–0 away win over Pescara. On 6 November he scored his second goal for Atalanta in the 24th minute of a 3–0 away win over Sassuolo. On 20 November he scored his third goal in 62nd minute of a 2–1 home win against Roma. After beating Everton in the Europa League, Caldara gained notoriety when he took off his outer clothes and strutted around the field in his briefs.

Juventus 
On 12 January 2017, Juventus announced that they had signed Caldara to a four-and-a-half-year contract for an initial transfer fee of €15 million, rising to a potential €25 million with add-ons. The deal also included a free loan, remaining at Atalanta until 30 June 2018.

Following the end of his loan deal with Atalanta, Caldara moved to Turin, where on 13 July 2018 he was officially presented as Juventus player and given the number 13 jersey with his last name on. He played his debut and only game for Juventus on 25 July 2018, an International Champions Cup friendly against Bayern Munich, replacing captain Giorgio Chiellini eight minutes into the second half.

AC Milan

2018–19 season 
On 2 August 2018, Caldara was signed by AC Milan on a five-year contract for €35 million payable in two years, with Leonardo Bonucci moving in the opposite direction in a similar deal. While being unable to choose 13 as his shirt number to pay tribute to Alessandro Nesta since it had already been taken by Alessio Romagnoli for the same reason, he opted for an available number 33, citing admiration for Thiago Silva. In his first month at Milanello, Caldara struggled with adapting to a four-man defense line with zonal marking, having played most of his career in teams that utilized a three-man defense with man-marking.

On 20 September 2018, Caldara made his official debut for Milan, playing as a starter alongside Romagnoli in a Europa League away match against F91 Dudelange. However, he failed to make a single appearance in October 2018, struggling with minor injuries that affected his overall fitness. Later that month, he suffered an Achilles tendon rupture, which sidelined him until February 2019. In April, a few days after Milan's 1–0 Coppa Italia semifinal loss to Lazio at the San Siro, in which Caldara played for 65 minutes as a starter, he suffered an even worse training injury, rupturing his left anterior cruciate ligament, which sidelined him for another period of 6 months.

2019–20 season 
Ahead of the 2019–20 season, Caldara gave away his number 33 shirt to Rade Krunić and later settled on the number 31 instead. Having recovered from his ACL injury, he resumed training sessions at full capacity on 9 October 2019, which coincided with Stefano Pioli's first day in Milan as a head coach. However, as Pioli was still reluctant to include Caldara in the first team line-ups 3 months since his full recovery from injuries, he submitted a loan or transfer request in early January 2020.

Return to Atalanta 
On 12 January 2020, it was announced that Caldara had joined Atalanta on loan from Milan until June 2021, with the option to buy for an undisclosed price. Three days later, he made his second post-return debut for Atalanta, playing for 77 minutes in a 1–0 away Coppa Italia loss against Fiorentina. On 19 February 2020, Caldara made his UEFA Champions League debut, playing for 75 minutes as a starter in a 4–1 home win against Valencia at the San Siro.

Loan to Venezia
On 9 August 2021, Caldara joined Venezia on loan with an option to buy. On 15 August, Caldara debuted for Venezia in a 1–1 draw against Frosinone in the first round of Coppa Italia, where Venezia won 8–7 at penalty shoot-out.

Loan to Spezia
On 17 July 2022, Caldara joined Spezia on loan for the 2022–23 season.

International career
In June 2017, Caldara was included in the Italy under-21 squad for the 2017 UEFA European Under-21 Championship by manager Luigi Di Biagio. Italy were eliminated by Spain in the semi-finals on 27 June, following a 3–1 defeat.

Caldara made his senior international debut for Italy under Roberto Mancini in a 3–1 friendly loss to France in Nice on 1 June 2018.

Style of play 
Caldara is a tall and physically strong center back contributing defensively and offensively. Although capable of playing in a back four, he is most comfortable and confident in the middle of a back three, such as in 3–4–3 or 3–5–2 formations. At Atalanta, while playing under coach Gian Piero Gasperini, he was allowed to make occasional forward runs during the attacking play and be present at all set pieces, which helped him score 10 goals in just two seasons. Courtesy of his imposing physique, he finds himself at ease in areal duels and headers. Tactically, Caldara has cited Alessandro Nesta as the biggest inspiration, in tribute of whom he had chosen 13 as his shirt number multiple times.

Career statistics

Club

International

Personal life
Caldara has been in a long-term relationship with Nicole Nessi, a fellow woman from his native city of Bergamo. On 10 June 2020, the couple welcomed their firstborn son Alessandro. In September 2018, Caldara enrolled in LUISS Sport Academy to earn a three-year bachelor's degree in economics and management.

References

External links
 RaiSport profile 
 Lega Serie A profile
 FIGC profile 

1994 births
Living people
Footballers from Bergamo
Italian footballers
Italy international footballers
Italy under-21 international footballers
Atalanta B.C. players
Trapani Calcio players
A.C. Cesena players
Serie A players
Serie B players
Association football defenders
Juventus F.C. players
A.C. Milan players
Venezia F.C. players
Spezia Calcio players